Daphne sophia is a shrub, of the family Thymelaeaceae.  It is endemic to the Central Russian Upland, including parts of both Russia and Ukraine.

Description
Daphne sophia grows to a height of 30 to 175 cm, in areas with steppe to forest vegetation, often on the fringes of forests. It flowers from May to July.

References

sophia
Flora of Ukraine
Flora of Central European Russia
Flora of South European Russia